Jair Lynch (born October 2, 1971) is an American gymnast and real estate developer in Washington, D.C., in the United States.  He won a silver medal in the parallel bars at the 1996 Summer Olympics. After leaving competitive gymnastics, he became a real estate developer and founded Jair Lynch Development Partners in 1998.

Early life
Lynch was born October 2, 1971, in Amherst, Massachusetts. His father, Acklyn Lynch, was born on the island of Trinidad in the Republic of Trinidad and Tobago. He grew up in the neighborhood of Woodbrook in the city of Port of Spain, and was an avid soccer player in his youth. He spent most of his adult life in the United States, however, obtaining his bachelor degree from Howard University in Washington, D.C., and his Ph.D. in political science and economics from Harvard University. His father's political activism led the government of Trinidad and Tobago to declare him an "undesirable" in the 1970s. Dr. Lynch taught at Howard University before becoming a professor of political economy and African American studies at the University of Maryland, Baltimore County. He later became chair of the Department of African Studies. Jair's mother, Martha Fernandez Lynch, was born in Bogotá, Colombia, and obtained her bachelor's degree from Universidad de los Andes. She came to the United States and obtained her master's degree in economics from the School of Advanced International Studies in 1964. She returned to the Universidad de los Andes to conduct research for two years before coming back to Washington, D.C.  The Lynches married in 1965.  Martha Lynch joined the Brookings Institution in 1966, but left after a short time to become an economist with the Organization of American States (OAS). She left the OAS in 1989, and became an independent consultant. Her clients included a wide range of international organizations, including the Inter-American Development Bank and the World Bank. Jair has a younger sister, Pilar. She graduated summa cum laude with a bachelor's degree in dance from New York University, and became a dancer and teacher in film and theater studies. She previously performed with the Alvin Ailey American Dance Theater.

The Lynch family moved to Washington, D.C., when Jair was three years old. Jair Lynch grew up in the Shepherd Park neighborhood of Washington, D.C., where he attended Alexander Shepherd Elementary School. He evinced an early interest in architecture, and at the age of three was already replicating famous buildings in the city using Play-Doh and covering tables with cities he would build from Legos (his favorite toy). Although he enjoyed basketball, football, and soccer as a youth, his short height (he topped out at ) and lack of weight (just  as an Olympic gymnast) mitigated against it. Yet he was extremely athletic.

Early involvement with gymnastics
Lynch became involved with gymnastics at the age of eight. At the age of 12, he predicted that he was going to be an Olympic athlete some day. Lynch was plagued with injuries before he turned 18. These included a broken ankle, arm,  finger, hand, and wrist (both of them). In 1985, he began training with coach Rick Tucker at the Gymnastics Plus club in Columbia, Maryland. His father drove him to every gymnastics meet. They would listen to jazz and hip-hop music, and discuss art, music, and sports.

At the 1987 USA Gymnastics' Junior Olympics, Lynch won the pommel horse championship. The following year, he compiled the highest score ever at the Junior Olympics. In 1990, he was the all-around men's champion at the meet.

Lynch graduated from Sidwell Friends School in Washington, D.C., and received a full-ride gymnastics scholarship from Stanford University.

Gymnastics

College career
At Stanford University, Lynch was a member and captain of the 1992 and 1993 teams which won the NCAA Men's Gymnastics championship. He was coached by Sadao Hamada and David Juszczyk.

He placed seventh in the all-around competition at the 1991 World Sports Fair.

Olympic career
At the 1992 United States Gymnastics Olympic Trials, Lynch played fourth in the all-around. Lynch became just the third African American to make the U.S. Olympic Team, and just the second to compete. At the 1992 Summer Olympics, Lynch finished sixth in the parallel bar competition and 60th in the all-around.  The U.S. men's gymnastics team finished sixth overall.

Lynch faced two major issues while preparing for the 1996 Olympic Summer Games. The first was a strength issue, which impaired his performance on the rings. The second was injuries. After the 1992 games, he suffered a broken left hand, ruptured sternum, and torn right rotator cuff. Lynch sought out Fred Stephens, the strength coach for the Stanford University football team. With Stephens' help, Lynch was able to significantly improve his upper body strength, which helped him to avoid further injury. Working with Sadao Hamada, coach for the 1992 men's Olympic gymnastic team, he developed routines which he felt more comfortable performing. At the American Cup gymnastics competition in early 1996, Lynch placed second. At the Coca-Cola National Championships, he placed first on the parallel bars. He finished sixth at the 1996 United States Gymnastics Olympic Trials after falling twice from the high bar.

Lynch was elected captain of the 1996 U.S. men's gymnastics Olympic team. At the 1996 Olympic Summer Games, he won a silver medal on the parallel bars, becoming the first African American man to win an individual Olympic medal in gymnastics and only the second American man to earn an individual Olympic medal in a non-boycott year since 1976.

Post-competition gymnastics
Beginning in 2004, Lynch began serving on the board of directors of the United States Olympic Committee. He stepped down at the end of 2012.

Business career
Lynch graduated from Stanford University in 1994 with a bachelor's degree in civil engineering and in urban design. He was nominated for a Rhodes scholarship upon graduation. In 2006, Lynch was a Loeb Fellow at the Harvard Graduate School of Design.

After graduating from Stanford, Lynch worked for three years in the real estate development arm of Silicon Graphics, a California-based computer company.

Lynch moved back to Washington, D.C., and in 1998 founded Jair Lynch Development Partners, a Washington, D.C.-based real estate development firm. The company started out working on small projects such as community centers and low-income housing. In 2003, it won a contract to manage the District of Columbia Department of Parks and Recreation's $100 million capital investment program. The company received a $120 million investment from local real estate developer Victor MacFarlane in 2015, which allowed the firm to begin purchasing sites for development and to operate its own assets. Lynch has stated that his firm is interested in developing neighborhoods around the buildings it develops to help build a stable population. As of 2015, the firm had developed  in and around the District of Columbia.

D.C. Olympic bids
Lynch was a member of the 2001 team which submitted the District of Columbia's bid for the 2012 Olympic Summer Games.

He was also a member of the 2014 team which submitted the District's bid for the 2024 Olympic Summer Games.

Personal life
Lynch's lifelong role model is Jackie Robinson, the African American who broke down racial discrimination in baseball.

Lynch is married to television and film producer Jocelyn Sigue. The couple had a daughter, Pilar, in 2009.

References
Notes

Citations

Bibliography

External links
 DatabaseOlympics.com profile
 Jair Lynch Development Partners Web site

1971 births
Gymnasts at the 1992 Summer Olympics
Gymnasts at the 1996 Summer Olympics
Olympic silver medalists for the United States in gymnastics
American gymnasts
Stanford Cardinal men's gymnasts
Living people
African-American sportsmen
Medalists at the 1996 Summer Olympics
Originators of elements in artistic gymnastics
21st-century African-American sportspeople
20th-century African-American sportspeople